Kevin Commins (23 February 1928 – 3 October 1995) was a South African cricketer. He played in twenty-nine first-class matches from 1951/52 to 1960/61.

References

External links
 

1928 births
1995 deaths
South African cricketers
Border cricketers
Western Province cricketers
Cricketers from Cape Town